Jacob Hillarye (died 1632) was an English organist.

Career
Hillarye was a Lay Vicar at Chichester Cathedral from 1590. He was appointed to the office of both Organist and Master of the Choristers in 1599. He was succeeded by Thomas Weelkes in 1602. He remained a choirman until at least 1616 and was landlord of the King's Head public house (now called Trents) in South Street, Chichester.

See also
 Organs and organists of Chichester Cathedral

References

1632 deaths
English classical organists
British male organists
Cathedral organists
Year of birth missing
Male classical organists